Prince Christian of Denmark, Count of Monpezat (Christian Valdemar Henri John; born 15 October 2005) is a member of the Danish royal family. He is the eldest child of Crown Prince Frederik and Crown Princess Mary. A grandson of Queen Margrethe II, he has been second in the line of succession to the Danish throne since birth, after his father.

Birth
Prince Christian was born at 1:57 am in Rigshospitalet, the Copenhagen University Hospital, in Copenhagen on Saturday, 15 October 2005. At noon on the day of his birth, 21-gun salutes were fired from the Sixtus Battery at Holmen in Copenhagen and at Kronborg Castle in Elsinore to mark the birth of a royal child. At the same time, public buses and official buildings flew the Danish flag, the Dannebrog. At sunset on the same day beacon bonfires were lit all over Denmark, while Naval Home Guard vessels lit their searchlights and directed them towards the capital. Bonfires were also lit in celebration in Australia.

Christian was hospitalised briefly on 21 October 2005 because he suffered from neonatal jaundice, a usually harmless illness and a fairly common one (especially in premature births). The first photographs of the then 6-day-old boy showed a yellow tinge to his face and hands. The prince was examined by doctors and underwent blood tests, then spent time in a light box under special coloured light rays to break down the bilirubin substance which causes jaundice. His parents took him home again the same day and he made a full recovery.

Christian was baptized on 21 January 2006 in Christiansborg Palace Chapel by Bishop Erik Norman Svendsen. Christian's godparents are his paternal uncle, Prince Joachim of Denmark; his maternal aunt, Jane Stephens; his father's first cousin, the Crown Prince of Greece; the Crown Prince and Crown Princess of Norway; the Crown Princess of Sweden; and two friends of the couple, Jeppe Handwerk and Hamish Campbell. He was named Christian Valdemar Henri John, continuing the Danish royal tradition of alternating between the names Christian and Frederik in direct line.

He received a number of presents on the occasion of his christening, including a pony called Flikflak from the Folketing, Denmark's national parliament.

Succession
Christian is second in line to the Danish throne (his father, Crown Prince Frederik, being first). Since the 16th century, first-born sons of Danish monarchs have traditionally been alternately named Frederik and Christian.

On 11 September 2006, Per Stig Møller, Denmark's Minister for Foreign Affairs, formally wrote and signed a hand-written document confirming Prince Christian's place in the line of succession. The prince's full name, his dates of birth and christening, and the names of his godparents were recorded as dictated by the Royal Law of 1799.

Education and activities

Christian was the first member of the Danish royal family to attend nursery school. At the same age, the Crown Prince had a nanny at the Palace to teach him rudimentary lessons. He is also the first member of the royal family to attend a public state school, Tranegårdskolen in Hellerup. The Danish court announced in October 2019 that Christian and his three younger siblings would undertake a 12-week school stay at Lemania-Verbier International School in Verbier, Switzerland, in the beginning of 2020. The stay was cut short and the siblings returned home in March due to the intensification of the COVID-19 situation in Denmark. In April 2021, it was announced that Christian would undertake his secondary education at the Danish boarding school Herlufsholm, starting in August 2021. In June 2022, shortly after finishing the first year of his upper secondary education, it was announced that Christian would no longer attend the school, after recurring allegations of bullying, violence and sexual abuse at the institution surfaced in a documentary. He instead attends the public school Ordrup Gymnasium.

Christian attended the opening of the new elephant house at the Copenhagen Zoo with his grandfather, Prince Henrik. Christian was the one who opened the elephant house by pressing a button on an interactive console. The elephants were a gift from the King and Queen of Thailand to the Queen and Prince Consort of Denmark on their last visit to Thailand. He and his siblings accompanied their parents on an official visit to Greenland on 1–8 August 2014, where Christian partook in several official engagements. Likewise, he accompanied his parents on most of their engagements during the family's official visit to the Faroe Islands on 23–26 August 2018.

Christian was confirmed on 15 May 2021 in the Royal Chapel of Fredensborg Palace. On 13 June 2021, Christian accompanied his grandmother and father at the COVID-19 postponed centenary of the reunification of Denmark and Northern Schleswig, following the route his great-great-grandfather Christian X rode on 15 July 1920 over the old border between Denmark and Germany. Accompanying his father, Christian attended a memorial for the victims of the 2022 Copenhagen mall shooting on 5 July 2022.

Titles, styles and honours

Titles and styles

Christian is styled as "His Royal Highness Prince Christian of Denmark, Count of Monpezat". He has been Prince of Denmark since birth and Count of Monpezat since 30 April 2008, when Queen Margrethe granted the title to her male-line descendants

Honours
 Denmark
 Recipient of the 75th Birthday Medal of Prince Henrik
 Recipient of the 70th Birthday Medal of Queen Margrethe II
 Recipient of the Ruby Jubilee Medal of Queen Margrethe II
 Recipient of the 75th Birthday Medal of Queen Margrethe II
 Recipient of the Golden Anniversary Medal of Queen Margrethe II and Prince Henrik 
 Recipient of the Prince Henrik's Commemorative Medal
 Recipient of the 80th Birthday Medal of Queen Margrethe II
 Recipient of the Golden Jubilee Medal of Queen Margrethe II

Other awards
In 2006 Scandinavian Airlines System was in the process of purchasing new Airbus A319 aircraft and in Christian's honour the first of these, delivered on 8 August 2006, was named Christian Valdemar Viking.

References

External links
Official website

|-

Danish princes
House of Monpezat
Royal children
2005 births
Living people
Counts of Monpezat
Danish people of Australian descent
Danish people of French descent
Danish people of Scottish descent